Gustavo Baquero is a Venezuelan engineer, professor and oil industry executive.  S&P said he would be named by Juan Guaidó's administration to be president of PDVSA (Venezuela's state-run petroleum company).

Raised in Caracas in a family of doctors, Baquero did undergraduate studies at Venezuela's Andres Bello Catholic University (UCAB) and graduate studies at Harvard University. He has taught petroleum economics at UCAB and business management of hydrocarbons at IESA in Caracas.  He was described by Americas Quarterly as an oil expert who would someday help rebuild Venezuela.  Together with Leopoldo López, he wrote Venezuela Energética.

Publications

References

External links
 

Living people
People of the Crisis in Venezuela
Year of birth missing (living people)